Andrea J. Ritchie is a writer, lawyer, and activist for women of color, especially LGBTQ women of color, who have been victims of police violence. She is the author of Invisible No More, a history of state violence against women of color, and co-author of No More Police: A Case for Abolition with Mariame Kaba.

Education

Ritchie attended Cornell University and Howard University School of Law. She clerked for Judge Emmet G. Sullivan on the United States District Court for the District of Columbia.

Career

Ritchie is a Researcher-in-Residence at the Social Justice Institute at the Barnard Center for Research on Women. Her writing has appeared in The New York Times, Teen Vogue, and Essence. In 2018, Ritchie co-authored the report SayHerName: Police Violence against Black Women and Women of Color with Kimberlé Crenshaw and the African American Policy Forum (Haymarket 2016). In 2022 she published No More Police: A Case for Abolition which she co-authored with Mariame Kaba. In No More Police she provides some details on events in her life that made her a prison and police  abolitionist, lays out arguments for why policing should be abolished, and discusses methods of creating safety without police.

Invisible No More 
In 2017, Ritchie published Invisible No More: Police Violence Against Black Women and Women of Color. In it, she gives a history of often-obscured state violence against women of color in the United States, beginning in the colonial period and continuing through the present, discussing how the historical precedent established current conditions. She ties practices in colonialism, slavery and Jim Crow to contemporary policing frameworks including broken windows policing and the wars on drugs, immigration, and terror. In a review for Policing and Society, Robert Nicewarner found four major contributions Ritchie made with the book: demonstrating the historically contingent and structural nature of police violence against women of color; the development of “mixed” methodology interweaving statistics and personal stories; demonstrating the insufficiency of police response to violence against women of color; and demonstrating the “dire need to resist and reform” these issues.

Bibliography
No More Police: A Case of Abolition, co-authored with Mariame Kaba, The New Press, 2022. 
Invisible No More: Police Violence Against Black Women and Women of Color, Beacon Press, 2017. 
Queer (In)Justice: The Criminalization of LGBT People in the United States, co-authored with Joey Mogul and Kay Whitlock, Beacon Press, 2012.

References 

American women writers
American lawyers
American activists
Living people
Year of birth missing (living people)
Place of birth missing (living people)
Cornell University alumni
Howard University School of Law alumni
21st-century American women
 Prison abolitionists